In mathematics, the McKay graph of a finite-dimensional representation  of a finite group  is a weighted quiver encoding the structure of the representation theory of .

If  has  irreducible characters, then the Cartan matrix  of the representation  of dimension  is defined by  where  is the Kronecker delta.

Definition
If

Moreover, if  we omit the weight label.

We can calculate the value of  using inner product  on characters: 

where  is the Kronecker delta.

Some results
 The McKay graph of a finite subgroup of  has no self-loops, that is,  for all .

Examples
Suppose , and there are canonical irreducible representations  of  respectively.

 

For example, the binary tetrahedral group  is generated by the  matrices:

 where  is a primitive eighth root of unity. In fact, we have

 
 
 
 
 
 
 

 Here  The canonical representation  is here denoted by .

See also 

 ADE classification
 Binary tetrahedral group

References 

 
 
 
 
 
 
 

Representation theory